The Herder Memorial Trophy, or Herder, is the championship trophy awarded annually to the senior ice hockey champions of Newfoundland and Labrador, Canada. The cast silver trophy was originally donated in 1935 by the Herder family, then owners of The Evening Telegram newspaper, as a memorial to five brothers who played hockey in St. John's. The Herder was first awarded to the Corner Brook team that won the inaugural all-Newfoundland hockey championship on March 22, 1935. The most recent winners of the Herder Memorial Trophy were the Southern Shore Breakers on April 23, 2022.

History
The Herder trophy was the brainchild of Ralph Herder, then president of The Evening Telegram, as a memorial to his five late brothers, Arthur, William, Douglas, Augustus and Hubert, who were all avid hockey players in St. John's, Newfoundland and Labrador. The trophy was donated in 1935 by The Evening Telegram newspaper to be awarded annually to Newfoundland's best ice hockey team. The Evening Telegram was published by a member of the Herder family since the founding of the paper in 1879 up until the retirement of Stephen Herder in 1993. The Telegram has played an integral role in the promotion and sponsorship of the Herder, which continues to this day.

Originally donated by Ralph Herder in memory of five of his late brothers, the trophy now honors the memory of seven brothers, including Ralph and his youngest brother James. In 2009, the name of Ralph's son Stephen was added to the trophy.  All seven Herder brothers were fine hockey players and often played together, with four of them sometimes playing together on a championship team. James Herder coached the 1935 Guards team that lost the inaugural Herder championship to Corner Brook in March 1935.

The St. John's Guards had earned the right to compete for the inaugural Herder Memorial Trophy in 1935 by first defeating St. Bon's in a 2-game series to become St. John's city champions, and later toppling the Bay Roberts Rovers in a 2-game, total goal series to become the Avalon Peninsula champions.  The championship match-up was then set – the Guards of St. John's would play host to the Corner Brook All-Star Team.  Fans in St. John's eagerly awaited the arrival of the Corner Brook Royals; tickets to the 2 games were sold out quickly.  The Royals edged the Guards 1–0 in Game 1, and were victorious in Game 2 by a 4–2 margin to become the island's top team, and Herder Trophy Champions.

Today, fan interest and competition is as keen as it was in the glory days of senior hockey.  The Herder Memorial Trophy will live forever in the minds and hearts of the people of Newfoundland.

The Herder family
William James Herder (1849–1922), born in Old Perlican, was the founder of Newfoundland's first daily newspaper, The Evening Telegram. Ralph, one of William's seven sons, became publisher of the Telegram after the death of Augustus (Gus), who was the fifth brother to pass away. 
Ralph donated the Herder Trophy on behalf of the Herder Family as a memorial to his five late brothers (Douglas, Arthur, Hubert, Herbert Augustus (Gus) and William Jr.). Later the names of Ralph (d.1955), his youngest brother James (d.1970) and Ralph's son Stephen (d.1993) were added to the trophy.

The Herder is now a memorial to the following Herder family members:

1. Arthur, a lawyer, was a captain in the First World War. In 1917 he was fatally wounded in France and died at age 32.

2. Hubert, a lieutenant when he was killed at Beaumont Hamel July 1, 1916 at the age of 25.

3. William, vice-president of the Evening Telegram when he died in 1934.

4. Douglas, who died from typhoid in 1908.

5. Augustus, vice-president of the Evening Telegram when he died in 1934.

6. Ralph, also a lieutenant, was seriously wounded July 1, 1916. He survived the war. He became the publisher of the Evening Telegram after the deaths of his brothers in 1934, and was the driving force behind the creation of the Herder Memorial Trophy in memory of his five brothers who predeceased him. Ralph, the father of Rendell [Rex] and Stephen, died in 1955 at the age of 61.

7. James was the youngest of the seven brothers. He was vice president and general manager of The Evening Telegram when his brother Ralph died in 1955. Jim took over as publisher and piloted The Evening Telegram Ltd through a period of tremendous growth and prosperity during the late 1950s and through the 1960s. He died in 1970.

8. Stephen succeeded his uncle Jim and was the longtime publisher of The Telegram. An environmentalist long before his time, he was known for saving Rennies River, and a bridge over that river is dedicated to his efforts. Steve was a proud proponent of the Herder memorial Trophy. He and died in 1993, at the age of 65.

The trophy

The Herder Trophy was donated in 1935. Over the years additional tiers were added to the original base, filled with shields bearing the names and years of championship teams.

St. Bon's star Edward "Key" Kennedy (1911–1955) was the model for the hockey player that stands atop the original trophy. It is well known that trophy-donor Ralph Herder took a photo of Kennedy, in playing pose, to New York, where he had a model made and then had the figure cast in silver.

The original trophy was retired by 2007 and is now displayed at the Newfoundland & Labrador Hockey Hall of Fame, located in the Corner Brook Civic Centre. A Herder replica was made to be awarded to the champions of the playoffs.

Conditions placed by the trophy donor
The Herder family attached eight conditions after donating the Herder Memorial Trophy to govern competition for the all-Newfoundland amateur hockey championship: 
Trophy to be known as "The Herder Memorial Trophy" presented by The Evening Telegram in memory of Arthur, Douglas, William, Augustus and Hubert Herder.
Trophy to be emblematic of the All-Newfoundland Amateur Hockey championship, and must be competed for each year in St. John's.
All matches held for the Trophy to be held under the rules of the body governing hockey in Newfoundland.
The Trophy cannot be won outright but is to be competed for each year.
The winner shall hold the Trophy until the start of the hockey season the following year and then it must be returned to the donors.
Arrangements for the playing of the All-Newfoundland championship are to be made by the main body governing hockey, the management of the rink, and the donors.
No names of teams or players winning the trophy to be engraved on the trophy or base.
If an All-Newfoundland championship is impossible in any year, the Trophy shall be held by the team winning the championship of the Avalon Peninsula or other Inter-Sectional championship.

Exceptions to the original conditions

Condition #2
From 1935 though 1941 the All-Newfoundland finals were played at the former Prince's Rink in St. John's (renamed The Arena in 1937). The Herder championships were cancelled for 1942 and 1943 after the Arena was destroyed by fire on November 28, 1941, and due to depleted rosters of senior hockey teams with men serving overseas during the Second World War. After the Arena burned down in November 1941, St. John's did not have a suitable venue until the opening of Memorial Stadium in December 1954. In 1944, the Herder finals were held outside St. John's for the first time when Bell Island and Corner Brook played the all-Newfoundland final series at the Corner Brook rink. The NAHA was granted permission by Ralph Herder to hold the Herder finals outside the capital city for the first time. Since 1944 condition #2 has not been enforced and the Herder Finals location has been decided by NAHA and typically held in the arenas of the competing teams.

In recent years, the Herder finals series was held at Mile One Centre (and before it was built, at Memorial Stadium) in St. John's and frequently sold out the 6,000 seat building. Games were also held in the Pepsi Centre in the city of Corner Brook, on the west coast of the island, when teams from that area were playing for the cup.

Since 2013 the Herder finalists have the right to decide the location of their home games.

Condition #4
In 1957 the first exception to condition #4 occurred when the Grand Falls Andcos were awarded the Herder by default. No other senior "A" hockey teams registered for the Herder playoffs that year.

Condition #7
Engraved plates with the names of the winning teams have been affixed to the base of the Herder Trophy since the late 1940s. Beginning in 1952, additional layers have been added to the trophy base as required to accommodate successive Herder Champion nameplates.

Series format
Over the history of the championship series, NAHA has dictated a number of series formats that included the winners of divisional, local league or island-wide league playoffs.The original series featured the eastern champions versus western champions. This format continued until 1962 when an island-wide Newfoundland Senior Hockey league was formed. The champions of the provincial leaque were awarded the Herder trophy until 1989 when the league was disbanded.  

On February 25, 2015, Hockey Newfoundland and Labrador approved a request by the Central West Senior Hockey League in which they asked to play for the historic Herder Trophy because it was the only operating Senior A hockey league registered in the province.

Hockey Newfoundland and Labrador announced on March 10, 2022 that they will be awarding the Herder Memorial Trophy to the winner of the Avalon East Senior Hockey League finals.

Series format history

This is a list of Herder championship series formats since 1935.

Note: GP = Games played, W = Wins, L = Losses, T = Ties, OTL = Overtime Losses, Pts = Points, GF = Goals for, GA = Goals against

Champions

Summary of Herder finals results and locations

Note: TG = Two games total goals series

Broadcasting
The first island-wide live broadcast of a Herder championship game was on the VONF radio station on Saturday night March 23, 1935. Jack Tobin provided the play-by-play of the second and final game of the first all-Newfoundland hockey championships between Corner Brook vs. the Guards of St. John's live from the Prince's Rink in St. John's. The final score was 4–2 for Corner Brook.

In 2007 and 2008, Rogers Television broadcast the Herder finals and province-wide using the Newfoundland and Labrador House of Assembly Channel. In 2009, games 3 to 5 of the finals were streamed online at thesportspage.ca.

Grand Falls-Windsor Broadcaster George Scott provided the play-by-play on a live webcast from 2011 to the 2019 Herder Finals.

References

Bibliography

External links
Herder History
See also: Abbott, Bill. Herder Memorial Trophy: A History of Senior Hockey in Newfoundland and Labrador'' (St. John's: Breakwater Books, 2000), 

Canadian ice hockey trophies and awards
Ice hockey in Newfoundland and Labrador
Newfoundland and Labrador awards
Senior ice hockey